Butyrophilin subfamily 3 member A1 is a protein that in humans is encoded by the BTN3A1 gene.

References

External links

Further reading